The 1998 bombing of Iraq (code-named Operation Desert Fox) was a major four-day bombing campaign on Iraqi targets from 16 to 19 December 1998, by the United States and the United Kingdom. On 16 December 1998, President of the United States Bill Clinton announced that he had ordered strikes against Iraq. The contemporaneous justification for the strikes was Iraq's failure to comply with United Nations Security Council resolutions and its interference with United Nations Special Commission inspectors who were looking for weapons of mass destruction, The inspectors were sent back in 1997 and were repeatedly refused access to certain sites thus compelling the U.S to launch strikes. However, Clinton's decision was criticized and challenged by many key members of Congress, accusing Clinton of directing attention away from ongoing impeachment proceedings against him.

The operation was a major flare-up in the Iraq disarmament crisis. The stated goal of the cruise missile and bombing attacks was to strike military and security targets in Iraq that contributed to Iraq's ability to produce, store, maintain, and deliver weapons of mass destruction. The bombing campaign had been anticipated since February 1998 and incurred wide-ranging criticism and support, in and outside of the US. Saudi Arabia, Bahrain, and the United Arab Emirates initially announced they would deny the U.S. military the use of local bases for the purpose of air strikes against Iraq.

Background
U.S. President Bill Clinton had been working under a regional security framework of dual containment, which involved punishing Saddam Hussein's regime with military force whenever Iraq challenged the United States or the international community.

Although there was no Authorization for Use of Military Force as there was during Operation Desert Storm and Operation Iraqi Freedom or a declaration of war, as in World War II, Clinton signed into law H.R. 4655, the Iraq Liberation Act on 31 October 1998. The new act appropriated funds for Iraqi opposition groups in the hope of removing Saddam Hussein from power and replacing his regime with a democratic government. Despite the act's intention of support of opposition groups, Clinton justified his order for US action under the act.

The act also stated that:

Nothing in this Act shall be construed to authorize or otherwise speak to the use of United States Armed Forces (except as provided in section 4(a)(2)) in carrying out this Act.

Section 4(a)(2) states:

The President is authorized to direct the drawdown of defense articles from the stocks of the Department of Defense, defense services of the Department of Defense, and military education and training for [Iraqi democratic opposition] organizations.

Just prior to Desert Fox, the U.S. nearly led a bombing campaign against Saddam called Operation Desert Thunder. It was abandoned at the last minute when the Iraqi leader allowed the UN to continue weapons inspections.

"Degrading," not eliminating

Clinton administration officials said the aim of the mission was to "degrade" Iraq's ability to manufacture and use weapons of mass destruction, not to eliminate it.  Secretary of State Madeleine Albright was asked about the distinction while the operation was going on:

I don't think we're pretending that we can get everything, so this is – I think – we are being very honest about what our ability is. We are lessening, degrading his ability to use this. The weapons of mass destruction are the threat of the future. I think the president explained very clearly to the American people that this is the threat of the 21st century. […] [W]hat it means is that we know we can't get everything, but degrading is the right word.

The main targets of the bombing included weapons research and development installations, air defense systems, weapon and supply depots, and the barracks and command headquarters of Saddam's elite Republican Guard. Also, one of Saddam's lavish presidential palaces came under attack. Iraqi air defense batteries, unable to target the American and British jets, began to blanket the sky with near random bursts of flak fire. The air strikes continued unabated however, and cruise missile barrages launched by naval vessels added to the bombs dropped by the planes. By the fourth night, most of the specified targets had been damaged or destroyed, the operation was deemed a success and the air strikes ended.

Military operations

Of significance, the operation marked the first time that women flew combat sorties as U.S. Navy strike fighter pilots and the first combat use of the U.S. Air Force's B-1B bomber from the 28th Air Expeditionary Group stationed at RAFO Thumrait, Sultanate of Oman. The U.S. Air Force sent several sorties of F-16s from the 34th Fighter Squadron, and 522nd Fighter Squadron into Iraq to fly night missions in support of Operation Desert Fox; they were based at Ahmad al-Jaber Air Base, Kuwait.

On the second night of Operation Desert Fox, aircrews flying 12 B-52s took off from the island of Diego Garcia in the Indian Ocean and launched 74 conventional air-launched cruise missiles (CALCMs).  The missiles found their mark striking multiple Iraqi targets including six of President Saddam Hussein's palaces, several Republican Guard barracks, and the Ministries of Defense and Military Industry.  The following evening, two more B-52 crews launched 16 more CALCMs. Over a two-night period aircrews from the 2nd and 5th Bomb Wings launched a total of 90 CALCMs. The B-1 bomber made its combat debut by striking at Republican Guard targets. Also on 17 Dec, USAF aircraft based in Kuwait participated,  as did British Royal Air Force Tornado aircraft. The British contribution totaled 15 percent of the sorties flown in Desert Fox.

By 19 December, U.S. and British aircraft had struck 97 targets, and Secretary of Defense William Cohen claimed the operation was a success. Supported by Secretary Cohen, as well as United States Central Command commander General Anthony C. Zinni and the Chairman of the Joint Chiefs of Staff General Henry H. Shelton, President Bill Clinton declared "victory" in Operation Desert Fox. In total, the 70-hour campaign saw U.S. forces strike 85 percent of their targets, 75 percent of which were considered "highly effective" strikes. More than 600 sorties were flown by more than 300 combat and support aircraft, and 600 air dropped munitions were employed, including 90 air-launched cruise missiles and 325 Tomahawk land attack missiles (TLAM). Operation Desert Fox inflicted serious damage to Iraq's missile development program, although its effects on any WMD program were not clear. Nevertheless, Operation Desert Fox was the largest strike against Iraq since the early 1990s Persian Gulf War, until the commencement of Operation Iraqi Freedom.In October 2021 General Zinni gave an upbeat bomb damage assessment of the operation 

97 sites were targeted in the operation with 415 cruise missiles and 600 bombs, including 11 weapons production or storage facilities, 18 security facilities for weapons, 9 military installations, 20 government CCC facilities, 32 surface-to-air missile batteries, 6 airfields, and 1 oil refinery. According to U.S. Defense Department assessments on 20 December 10 of these targets were destroyed, 18 severely damaged, 18 moderately damaged, 18 lightly damaged, and 23 not yet assessed. According to the Iraqi Deputy Prime Minister, the allied action killed (62) or wounded (180) some 242 Iraqi military personnel. American General Harry Shelton told the U.S. Senate on 5 January 1999, however, that the strikes killed or wounded an estimated 1,400 members of Iraq's Republican Guard.

Reaction
In reaction to the attack, three of five permanent members of the UN Security Council (Russia, France, and the People's Republic of China) called for lifting of the eight-year oil embargo on Iraq, recasting or disbanding UNSCOM, and firing its chairman, Australian diplomat Richard Butler.

Criticism

Accusations of U.S. interference in the U.N. inspection process
Iraq stopped cooperating with the U.N. special commission in the first month of 1998, but diplomacy by Kofi Annan brought fresh agreement and new modalities for the inspection of sensitive sites. Deputy Prime Minister Tariq Aziz had earlier accused UNSCOM officials of acting as spies for the United States, charges later supported by Scott Ritter and Bill Tierney.

In a 2005 interview, Ritter criticized the Clinton administration's use of a blocked inspection of a Ba'ath party headquarters to justify the bombing.

However, in his 1999 book Endgame Ritter explained that he was the one who had originally pushed for the fateful inspection of the Ba'ath party headquarters over the doubts of his boss Richard Butler and also planned to use 37 inspectors. It was temporarily cancelled due to the fact that Iraq broke off cooperation in August 1998.

In early 1999 it was revealed that the CIA, as well as possibly MI6, had planted agents in the UNSCOM teams, leading the UN to admit that "UNSCOM had directly facilitated the creation of an intelligence collection system for the United States in violation of its mandate." As part of the CIA's Operation Shake the Tree, run by Steve Richter of the Near East Division, a "black box" was installed at UNSCOM's headquarters in Baghdad to eavesdrop on Saddam's presidential communications network. The information collected by the agency was not shared with UNSCOM investigators.

Inspectors not thrown out
The claim that UNSCOM weapons inspectors were expelled by Iraq has been repeated frequently. U.S. Secretary of State Colin Powell, in his 5 February 2003 speech before the U.N. Security Council, called for action against Iraq and stated falsely that "Saddam Hussein forced out the last inspectors in 1998". 
The claim has appeared repeatedly in the news media. 
However, according to UNSCOM inspector Richard Butler himself, it was U.S. Ambassador Peter Burleigh, acting on instructions from Washington, who suggested Butler pull his team from Iraq in order to protect them from the forthcoming U.S. and British air strikes:

I received a telephone call from US Ambassador Peter Burleigh inviting me for a private conversation at the US mission... Burleigh informed me that on instructions from Washington it would be "prudent to take measures to ensure the safety and security of UNSCOM staff presently in Iraq." ... I told him that I would act on this advice and remove my staff from Iraq.

Facilities not known to be producing WMD

Former U.S. Army intelligence analyst William Arkin contended in his January 1999 column in The Washington Post that the operation had less to do with WMD and more to do with destabilizing the Iraqi government.

According to Department of Defense personnel with whom Arkin spoke, Central Command chief Anthony Zinni insisted that the U.S. only attack biological and chemical sites that "had been identified with a high degree of certainty." And the reason for the low number of targets, said Arkin, was because intelligence specialists "could not identify actual weapons sites with enough specificity to comply with Zinni's directive."

Dr. Brian Jones was the top intelligence analyst on chemical, biological and nuclear weapons at the Ministry of Defence. He told BBC Panorama in 2004 that Defence Intelligence Staff in Whitehall did not have a high degree of confidence any of the facilities identified, targeted and bombed in Operation Desert Fox were active in producing weapons of mass destruction. Jones' testimony is supported by the former Deputy Chief of Defence Intelligence, John Morrison, who informed the same program that, before the operation had ended, DIS came under pressure to validate a prepared statement to be delivered by then Prime Minister Tony Blair, declaring military activity an unqualified success. Large-scale damage assessment takes time, responded Morrison, therefore his department declined to sign up to a premature statement. "After Desert Fox, I actually sent a note round to all the analysts involved congratulating them on standing firm in the face of, in some cases, individual pressure to say things that they knew weren't true". Later on, after careful assessment and consideration, Defence Intelligence Staff determined that the bombing had not been all that effective.

Within days of speaking out on the program, Morrison was informed by former New Labour cabinet minister Ann Taylor that he was to lose his job as Chief Investigator to the Intelligence and Security Committee.

The Duelfer Report concluded in 2004 that Iraq's WMD capability "was essentially destroyed in 1991" following the end of sanctions.

Distraction from Clinton impeachment scandal
Some critics of the Clinton administration, including Republican members of Congress, expressed concern over the timing of Operation Desert Fox. The four-day bombing campaign occurred at the same time the U.S. House of Representatives was conducting the impeachment hearing of President Clinton.  Clinton was impeached by the House on 19 December, the last day of the bombing campaign. A few months earlier, similar criticism was levelled during Operation Infinite Reach, wherein missile strikes were ordered against suspected terrorist bases in Sudan and Afghanistan, on 20 August. The missile strikes began three days after Clinton was called to testify before a grand jury during the Lewinsky scandal and his subsequent nationally televised address later that evening in which Clinton admitted having an inappropriate relationship.

The Operation Infinite Reach attacks became known as "Monica's War" among TV news people, due to the timing. ABC-TV announced to all stations that there would be a special report following Lewinsky's testimony before Congress, then the special report was pre-empted by the report of the missile attacks. The combination of the timing of that attack and Operation Desert Fox led to accusations of a Wag the Dog situation. Journal of Muslim Minority Affairs published an article accused Clinton of bombing Iraq to distract from Lewinsky's testimony. This led to speculation that Clinton aide Huma Abedin may have had a role in accusing Clinton of bombing Iraq due to her working there at the time.

Criticism of the extent of the operation
Other critics, such as former U.S. Secretary of State Henry Kissinger, said the attacks did not go far enough: "I would be amazed if a three-day campaign made a decisive difference," Kissinger said just after the operation ended.

[W]e did not do, in my view, enough damage to degrade it [Iraq's programs for weapons of mass destruction] for six months. It doesn't make any significant difference because in six months to a year they will be back to where they are and we cannot keep repeating these attacks. [...] At the end of the day what will be decisive is what the situation in the Middle East will be two to three years from now. If Saddam is still there, if he's rearming, if the sanctions are lifted, we will have lost, no matter what spin we put on it.

It is speculated that there were dozens of Iraqi civilians killed by missiles that missed their targets, hundreds in the Iraqi military, and no U.S. or British casualties.

While the bombing was ongoing, the Vanguards of Conquest issued a communique to Islamist groups calling for attacks against the United States "for its arrogance" in bombing Iraq.

According to Charles Duelfer, after the bombing the Iraqi ambassador to the UN told him, "If we had known that was all you would do, we would have ended the inspections long ago."

See also
January 1993 airstrikes on Iraq
1993 cruise missile strikes on Iraq
1996 cruise missile strikes on Iraq

References

External links

Overview of Operation Desert Fox – DefenseLink
Operation Desert Fox – BBC News
Transcript of President Clinton's speech announcing the attack – CNN
Iraq attacked in 'Operation Desert Fox' – CNN
Strike on Iraq – Operation Desert Fox – CNN
Operation Desert FoxE: Effectiveness With Unintended Effects
Operation Desert Fox
Tony Holmes (2005). US Navy F-14 Tomcat Units of Operation Iraqi Freedom, Osprey Publishing Limited.

1998 in international relations
Bombing
20th-century military history of the United States
20th-century Royal Air Force deployments
Aerial bombing operations and battles
Airstrikes conducted by the United States
1998 bombing
Battles involving the United Kingdom
Battles involving the United States
Clinton administration controversies
Conflicts in 1998
December 1998 events in Asia
Explosions in 1998
Explosions in Iraq
1998 bombing
1998 bombing
1998 bombing
United States Marine Corps in the 20th century
Airstrikes in Iraq
Attacks in 1998

ja:イラク武装解除問題#砂漠の狐作戦